Rosaramicin (rosamicin) is an antibacterial substance that is chemically a lipid-soluble basic macrolide similar to erythromycin but with a better activity against Gram-negative bacteria.

Experiments in dogs have shown that it is more concentrated in the prostate than erythromycin is, and thus may be better for treating infections of that organ.

References

Macrolide antibiotics
Epoxides
Heterocyclic compounds with 2 rings